The 138th Illinois Infantry Regiment was an infantry regiment from Illinois that served in the Union Army between June 21 and October 14, 1864, during the American Civil War.

Service 
The regiment was organized at Camp Wood, Quincy, Illinois and mustered in for one-hundred day service on June 21, 1864, with Colonel J.W. Goodwin as commander. The Secretary of War, Edwin M. Stanton, ordered the regiment to proceed to Fort Leavenworth, Kansas, where it was assigned to garrison duty.

The counties of Jackson, Clay, Platte, Ray, Lafayette as well as other counties along the western border of Missouri, were over-run by bands of pro-Confederate bushwhackers. On July 7, Companies "C" and "F" were ordered to Weston, Missouri, and during July, August, and a portion of September, they remained on active duty and succeeded in clearing the counties of bushwhackers. Following the defeat of the bushwhackers, Companies "C" and "F" returned to garrison duty at Fort Leavenworth.

In the meantime, General Sterling Price, had invaded and occupied Missouri from the southeast, cutting off communications between St. Louis and the southeast. The regiment voluntarily extended its term of service and proceeded along the Iron Mountain Railroad guarding railway bridges from destruction by Price's Army. Following the defeat of General Price's army, the regiment returned to Camp Butler, Illinois and was mustered out on October 14, 1864. During its service the regiment incurred ten fatalities.

See also
List of Illinois Civil War Units

Notes

References

Bibliography 
 Dyer, Frederick H. (1959). A Compendium of the War of the Rebellion. New York and London. Thomas Yoseloff, Publisher. .
 Reece. Brigadier General J.N. (1900). The Report of Illinois from Military and Naval Department of the Adjutant General of the State of Illinois. Containing Reports for the Years 1861–1866. Springfield, Illinois. Journal Company, Printers and Binders.

Units and formations of the Union Army from Illinois
Military units and formations established in 1864
1864 establishments in Illinois
Military units and formations disestablished in 1864